R. A. Chandrasena (Sinhala: ආර්. ඒ. චන්ද්‍රසේන) was a Sri Lankan musician who earned his reputation as a highly talented and gifted artist and also by his contribution to the Sri Lankan music discipline and the industry during 1940–1980.

He commenced his career when he was twelve years old in late 1930s at his entry to the musical programmes in Radio Ceylon (now known as Sri Lanka Broadcasting Corporation) with his gifted talents in playing many musical instruments whatever came to his hands. Notably, excelling in keyboard instruments such as harmonium, piano accordion, piano, organ and also the oriental instruments such as tabla, mandolin and violin.

Chandrasena established his institute of music in December 1951 and titled it as Chandrasena Sangeethaayathanaya (Chandrasena Institute of Music). This institute turned out be the stepping stone for many musicians in that era and in the subsequent generation. R A Chandrasena provided his expertise, knowledge and mentorship to many artists in a humble and relentless manner during his lifetime.

In 1969, Chandrasena launched a gramophone record company by which 45 RPM EP records were issued to the Sri Lankan Sinhala songs market under the labels of RAC and Shrimath. All the songs in these records were composed and music directed by R A Chandrasena and he managed to use the talents of many professional singers and lyrics writers effectively in these master pieces.

During his relatively short life, he achieved reputations as a professional composer, a singer, a drama/film music director, a music teacher and more over as a mentor for many musicians and artists at the early stages of their professional path, especially in refining their talents. Among the many, the key personalities who were well coached and mentored by Chandrasena are Dharmadasa Walpola (1949), Guruge Khemadasa Perera, later known as Premasiri Khemadasa (1953), and Victor Ratnayake (1962).

Life in brief (1924–1980)
Chandrasena was born on 27 August 1924 in Mahanuvara, much known as Kandy, in central Sri Lanka to a Sinhala Buddhist family. At birth, he was named as Ranasinghe Arachchige Chandrasena Perera. His parents were Ranasinghe Arachchige Jeiris Perera and Selesthina Dias Abeysinghe whose generations had been from Mahanuwara. Chandrasena was the third child of the eleven children in the family. His father was not a musician by profession, but a highly talented musician whose exposure could have influenced Chandrasena to admire music since his childhood.

Chandrasena was educated at Sri Rahula college in Kandy, Prince College in Kotahena and Sri Dharmaloka College in Keleniya. He had the privilege of being mentored by Ananda Samarakoon at Prince College, D B Dhanapala and C M Weerartne at Sri Dharmaloka College. D B Dhanapala was the principal at Sri Dharmaloka College who later became a veteran journalist in Sri Lanka and the Editor-in-Chief at DAVASA newspaper founded in 1961 by M. D. Gunasena and Company, Sri Lanka. C. M. Weeraratne was a teacher at Sri Dharmaloka College who later became the Vice Principal of Ananda College. Further, Chandrasena was also mentored and well supported by U A S Perera, well known as Siri Ayya in his children musical programmes at Radio Ceylon.

In 1943, Chandrasena met a young talented singer, named Mohoppu Arachchige Shriyaawathie Perera, who was later known as Sriyani Chandrasena, at an audition programme that was conducted at Radio Ceylon. They got married on 26 July 1946. Sriyani had a brief career as a singer, but largely, she became the devoted lifetime supporting partner for Chandrasena in all his musical creations and events throughout. They had three children: Thilangani, Lalith and Darshani.

R A Chandrasena died in the early hours of 1 March 1980, after a brief heart illness. Sriyani continued Chandrasena's vision and the practice at Chandrasena Sangeethaanayathanaya and prepared the youngest daughter Darshani Chandrasena Perera in the music profession. Darshani was graduated in music at the Faculty of Esthetic Studies at University of Kelaniya, Sri Lanka, and became a teaching professional in music.

Sriyani Chandrasena died on 4 August 2009.

Discography

Music director

As a singer
Chandrasena's singing voice became much heard and popular by the famous song "Dasabaladhari Budu Raju Pera Kala" in 1948 March. This was the theme song of the stage drama Sanda Kinduri that was produced by Vasantha Kumara, a well reputed oriental dancer.  The lyrics of the song was done by S L Kakulawela who later became the first Professor of Linguistics in Sri Lanka, and the Vice Chancellor of the University of Kelaniya. The lyrics was based on the story of a previous life (Chanda Kinnara Jaathakaya) of Gautama Buddha  during which he was born as a mermaid species in the Himalayan mountain range in India. This song was composed by R A Chandrasena himself and this was supposed to be his first ever melody. This is still a well known and much respected song in the Sri Lankan music. The song was later reproduced and sung by his grandson Harshadewa Ariyasinghe on 23 May 2013.

References

External links
  Official web site of R.A. Chandrasena
 R.A. Chandrasena Songs on line

Sinhalese musicians
1924 births
1980 deaths
Musicians from Kandy
Faculty of Ananda College